Paul Victor (born March 28, 1984) is a Dominican international footballer.

Career 
Victor played with London City of the Canadian Professional Soccer League in 2000. He made his debut on July 21, 2000 against the Toronto Olympians. In 2007 he played with Harlem United FC in the Dominica Premier League. He also played with the Dominica national football team, where he made his international debut on March 19, 2000 against Haiti. In total he has appeared in 11 matches.

References 

1984 births
Living people
Dominica international footballers
Dominica footballers
Dominica expatriate footballers
London City players
Canadian Soccer League (1998–present) players
Association football defenders
Harlem United FC players
Expatriate soccer players in Canada
Dominica expatriate sportspeople in Canada